The following is a list of the monastic houses in County Londonderry.

References

See also
List of monastic houses in Ireland

Monastic houses
Monastic houses
Londonderry
Monastic houses